Jacques-Cartier is an arrondissement, or borough, of the city of Sherbrooke, Quebec. The borough comprises the portion of pre-amalgamation Sherbrooke located north of the Magog River. It contains the Carrefour de l'Estrie shopping centre and the Bois Beckett Park, one of few old-growth forests in the region.

The borough had a population of 32,555 in 2009.

Government

The borough is represented by four councillors on the Sherbrooke City Council. Its current councillors are Chantal L'Espérance, Marc Denault, Nathalie Goguen and Pierre Tardif.

References

External links
Borough of Jacques-Cartier

Boroughs of Sherbrooke